Takahiro Saeki (佐伯 貴弘, born April 18, 1970 in Osaka, Osaka, Japan) is a former Nippon Professional Baseball infielder.

Under former manager Motonobu Tanishige he was a fielding coach for the Chunichi Dragons, but with Tanishige's dismissal as manager on 10 August 2016, Saeki was also relieved from his position.

References

External links

1970 births
Living people
Baseball people from Osaka
Japanese baseball players
Nippon Professional Baseball infielders
Yokohama BayStars players
Chunichi Dragons players
Japanese baseball coaches
Nippon Professional Baseball coaches